The SS Cameronia was a twin propeller triple-expansion 15,600 IHP passenger steamship owned by the Glasgow-based Anchor Line and built by D. and W. Henderson and Company at Glasgow in 1911. The ship provided a transatlantic service from Glasgow to various destinations.

The Cameronia sailed on her maiden voyage for the Anchor Line company on 13 September 1911 on the Glasgow - Moville - New York City route. In February 1915, the Cameronia was employed in a joint Anchor-Cunard company service on the Glasgow - Liverpool - New York route.

On 21 June 1915 while inbound in the mouth of the Mersey the Cameronia was attacked by a U-boat.  Captain Kinnaird turned to ram the U-boat which was forced to dive and then broke off her attack.

The Cameronia was torpedoed on 15 April 1917 by the German U-boat  while en route from Marseille, France, to Alexandria, Egypt. She was serving as a troopship at the time and contained approximately 2,650 soldiers on board. The ship sank in 40 minutes, 150 miles east of Malta; taking 210 lives. Other sources report only 140 casualties. The remainder of the survivors had sufficient time to take to lifeboats.

Scottish commodore and nautical writer David W. Bone wrote a firsthand account of the sinking of Cameronia.

References

Passenger ships of the United Kingdom
Ocean liners
Steamships of the United Kingdom
World War I shipwrecks in the Mediterranean Sea
Ships sunk by German submarines in World War I
World War I passenger ships of the United Kingdom
Troop ships of the United Kingdom
Maritime incidents in 1917
Ships built on the River Clyde
1911 ships